Christopher Noel Banks (born 12 November 1965) is an English former professional footballer who played as a defender and later worked as a physiotherapist.

Starting his career with Port Vale in 1982, he moved on to Exeter City in 1988. He was at Bath City from 1989 to 1994, before spending ten years with Cheltenham Town. He is considered a highly significant player in the histories of both Bath and Cheltenham, both of whom he captained for many years. In all he played 766 league games in a 20-year career, between 1982 and 2002. He was promoted four times in his career, and also won the FA Trophy in 1998. After retiring in 2002 he went on to qualify as a physiotherapist and worked at Stoke City and Port Vale.

Playing career

Port Vale
Banks began his career as an apprentice with Port Vale, turning professional in December 1982. He had to wait until 29 January 1985 before he made his debut, in a 1–1 draw with Northampton Town in the Football League Trophy. He went on to make seven Fourth Division and three cup appearances in 1984–85. He played nineteen league games in 1985–86, as the "Valiants" won promotion into the Third Division; he also scored his first senior goal, salvaging a point in a 1–1 draw with Burnley at Vale Park on 24 February. He played 34 games in 1986–87, as Vale secured their third tier status under the stewardship of John Rudge. After a reserve match at Barnsley on 23 September 1987, he was attacked by a gang of youths and had his nose broken whilst waiting at a fish and chip shop. He made 21 appearances in 1987–88, before he was released.

Exeter City
He joined Exeter City in June 1988 as one of manager Terry Cooper's first signings at the club. He briefly played in goal during an emergency situation against Peterborough United and would prank the local media by telling them he was a nephew of Gordon Banks. Despite playing in all but three of the "Grecians" games the following season, Banks was released from his contract at St James Park.

Bath City
In June 1989 he joined Bath City. He was player of the year the following season and became club captain for the four seasons after that. In five years at Twerton Park, he won the Somerset Premier Cup three times, and finished second in the Southern League in 1989–90. He played 259 games for the club, also serving as captain.

Cheltenham Town
In July 1994, Banks, requested a move north to a club closer to his Staffordshire home, and was signed by Cheltenham Town, along with Martin Boyle, for a combined fee of £16,000. He went on to captain the side as they rose from the Southern League to the Football League. While playing part-time at Whaddon Road he worked as a tiler, but resumed full-time football on Cheltenham's promotion to the Football League. Finishing second in the Southern League in 1996–97, the "Robins" finished second in the Conference in 1997–98, and Banks was named as the club's Player of the Year for 1998. Cheltenham finished as champions of the Conference in 1998–99 under the stewardship of Steve Cotterill. Banks also played in the 1998 FA Trophy Final at Wembley, as Cheltenham beat Southport 1–0. He helped Cheltenham to the Second Division following victory in the 2002 Third Division play-off Final. He briefly served the club as caretaker-manager following Graham Allner's departure in January 2003, before the appointment of Bobby Gould early the following month. He was forced to retire through injury in November 2004, and later trained to be a physiotherapist. In the 2006 publication Cheltenham Town Football Club 50 Greats, Banks was included in the list by authors Tom Goold and Jon Palmer.

Physiotherapy career
He worked as a postman for four years while completing his training, before he was appointed as youth academy physiotherapist at Stoke City in 2007. He graduated from the University of Salford in 2007 with a degree in Physiotherapy. He worked as a postman whilst studying at university. In June 2019, he left Stoke to work as the head physiotherapist at Potteries derby rivals Port Vale. He retired from football in June 2022.

Personal life
Banks played cricket as a spin bowler for his hometown side, Stone, who he captained to the North Staffs and South Cheshire League Premier Division title in 2006. His younger brother Ian was also a professional with Port Vale, but was released after just one year; he went on to have a successful career in non-league football.

Career statistics

Playing statistics
Source:

Managerial statistics
Source:

Honours
Individual
Bath City F.C. Player of the Year: 1990
Cheltenham Town F.C. Player of the Year: 1995, 1998

Port Vale
Football League Fourth Division fourth-place promotion: 1985–86

Bath City
Southern Football League second-place promotion: 1989–90
Somerset Premier Cup: 1989, 1990 & 1994

Cheltenham Town
Southern Football League second-place promotion: 1996–97
Conference: 1998–99
FA Trophy: 1998
Football League Third Division play-offs: 2002

References

1965 births
Living people
People from Stone, Staffordshire
English footballers
England semi-pro international footballers
Association football defenders
Port Vale F.C. players
Exeter City F.C. players
Bath City F.C. players
Cheltenham Town F.C. players
English Football League players
Southern Football League players
National League (English football) players
English football managers
Cheltenham Town F.C. managers
English Football League managers
Alumni of the University of Salford
Association football physiotherapists
Stoke City F.C. non-playing staff
Port Vale F.C. non-playing staff